The Equal Parenting Alliance is a minor political party in the United Kingdom. Founded in February 2006, it aims to bring about reform of the Family law system in England and Wales. It was started by former members of Real Fathers 4 Justice, a father's rights organisation, and a similar group New Fathers 4 Justice. Its leader is Ray Barry.

The party supports custody being split equally for both parents and that a non-residing parent should be able to spend up to 100 days and nights with their child.

Organisation and membership
The party is made up of a committee and members. Membership was 71 at the end of 2008.

Party income in 2006 was £1,245, £2,527 in 2007, and £345 in 2008.

Elections
The party has contested: 
Carrick, Cumnock and Doon Valley election in May 2007, in which Ray Barry gained 124 votes.
Runnymede Council election in May 2007, in which Keith Collett gained 17 votes.
Wolverhampton Council election in May 2008, in which Ray Barry gained 101 votes.
Runnymede Council election in May 2009, in which Keith Collett gained 84 votes.

Two candidates stood in the 2010 United Kingdom general election, Ray Barry for Wolverhampton South West and Roger Crawford in Oxford East.

Party policies
The party policies are:
Legal presumption of reasonable parenting time in the event of parental separation.
Shared residence should be normal when there are two fit, capable parents.
All contact and parenting time arrangements will be governed by the Good Reason Principle.
The introduction of the Early Interventions Pilot Project, to replace the Family Resolutions Project.
Compulsory mediation for both parents after separation and before entering into the court system. Any parent refusing to attend may be so ordered by the court and on subsequent refusal will be charged with contempt of court.
All Family Court cases involving children to be transparent and accountable, and all reporting to be anonymised to protect children from publicity.
Court orders for contact, parenting time and shared or joint residence, must be enforced by the courts unless there is good reason to do otherwise.
All allegations of domestic violence or child abuse made during a child contact case should be made under oath, and dealt with quickly by a criminal court capable of delivering a clear verdict.
Any parent who deliberately harms a child’s relationship with either parent, without good reason, should be treated as being guilty of emotional and psychological abuse of the child.
All fathers, regardless of marital status or naming on the birth certificate, to be given parental responsibility. Where paternity is in doubt, a DNA test must be used.
Both parents must have access to a child’s medical and educational records, and full involvement in school activities.
Grandparents should have a legal right to apply for contact with their grandchildren.

References

External links
Equal Parenting Alliance: party web site
Equal Parenting Alliance: party Scottish web site
Equal Parenting Alliance party leader Ray Barry speaking on family law on Australian "Dads on the Air" radio program

Gender equality
Political parties in the United Kingdom
Family and parenting issues groups in the United Kingdom
Political parties established in 2006
Fathers' rights organizations
2006 establishments in the United Kingdom